The Northwest Historic District is a U.S. historic district (designated as such on January 22, 1992) located in West Palm Beach, Florida. The district is bounded by Tamarind Avenue, Eleventh Street, Rosemary Avenue and 3rd Street. It contains 316 historic buildings. The West Palm Beach Community Development Agency has targeted the area, and is restructuring Tamarind Avenue and 7th Streets. They are also restoring the Sunset Lounge, called the "Cotton Club of the South", one of the few remaining venues on the Chitlin' Circuit.

References

External links

 Palm Beach County listings at National Register of Historic Places
 Historic Northwest Newsletters
 June, 2017
 July, 2017
 September, 2017

National Register of Historic Places in Palm Beach County, Florida
Historic districts on the National Register of Historic Places in Florida
West Palm Beach, Florida
Historic districts in Palm Beach County, Florida